Bourreria velutina is a species of plant in the family Boraginaceae. It is endemic to Jamaica.

References

velutina
Endangered plants
Endemic flora of Jamaica
Taxonomy articles created by Polbot